The Vernonia Pioneer Museum is a history museum, located in Vernonia, Oregon, United States. The building that houses the museum is listed on the National Register of Historic Places as the Oregon–American Lumber Company Mill Office.

References

External links
Museum web site

National Register of Historic Places in Columbia County, Oregon
Buildings and structures completed in 1924
History museums in Oregon
Museums in Columbia County, Oregon
1924 establishments in Oregon
Houses in Columbia County, Oregon